Diego Terra Loureiro (born 28 July 1998), sometimes known as just Diego Loureiro, is a Brazilian footballer who plays as a goalkeeper for Atlético Goianiense, on loan from Botafogo.

Career statistics

Club

Honours
Botafogo
 Campeonato Brasileiro Série B: 2021

References

1998 births
Living people
Brazilian footballers
Footballers from Rio de Janeiro (city)
Association football goalkeepers
Campeonato Brasileiro Série A players
Campeonato Brasileiro Série B players
Botafogo de Futebol e Regatas players
Atlético Clube Goianiense players